Warrenby Halt was a railway station opened in 1920 having been built to serve the village of Warrenby in Redcar and Cleveland, England and the nearby Dorman Long works. It consisted of wooden platforms and brick-built shelters and was gas-lit.

In 1978 the railway was diverted to allow for the building of the Redcar steelworks, leaving Warrenby bypassed. A new station Redcar British Steel opened on the deviation line to take its place. (The replacement station was officially the quietest station on the entire British rail network with only 40 passengers in 2017–18.) 

One of Warrenby Halt's platforms survives at Newton Dale Halt on the North Yorkshire Moors Railway.

References

External links
 Webpage including photographs of Warrenby Halt

Disused railway stations in Redcar and Cleveland
Railway stations in Great Britain opened in 1920
Railway stations in Great Britain closed in 1978
Former North Eastern Railway (UK) stations